"Nero the Second" or "Nero II" is a traditional ballad that was popular amongst Jacobites in Great Britain and Ireland during the first half of the eighteenth century.

The Nero of the title, a reference to the tyrannical Roman Emperor Nero, is a thinly disguised version of George I the Hanoverian who had come to the throne in 1714. Jacobites supported a rival Stuart claimant the English-born James Francis Edward Stuart, styled James III by his followers, who was now living in exile.

References

Bibliography
 Jane Fenlon. The Dukes of Ormonde, 1610–1745. Boydell & Brewer, 2000.
 Paul Kleber Monod. Jacobitism and the English People, 1688–1788. Cambridge University Press, 1993.

Jacobite songs
Year of song unknown
18th-century songs